Catherine Kamau Karanja (born February 3, 1987) is a Kenyan award-winning actress, popularly known as "Celina" (or "Selina") and "Kate Actress".

She came into the limelight for her role in the Citizen TV show, Mother In-Law where she played Celina. She has also featured in other films such as Sue na Jonie (2017-2019), Plan B, and Disconnect.

Catherine attended Chogoria High School where she joined the drama club and became well known for her talent, before moving to Loreto Convent Msongari where she won the 'Miss Loreto' Award.

She has a Diploma in Communications, majoring in public relations from Kenya College of Communication and Technology which was upgraded to MultiMedia University of Kenya.

Kamau is the brand ambassador for Harpic Kenya and the Nice and Lovely Petroleum Jelly.

Career
Kamau played the role of Selina (or Celina) the wife of Charlie (Patrick Oketch) on the Citizen TV drama series Mother-in-Law which began in 2006. She then left the show for the Swahili language TV series Sue Na Jonnie, in which she played the role of Sue.

She won the Best Lead Actress in the TV Drama Series category in the Kalasha Awards 2017 and again received a nomination in 2018, for her role in "Sue Na Jonnie". She was nominated in the Best Supporting Actress in a Film category of the Kenya Film Commission Kalasha Awards 2018 for her role in the film Disconnect.

She played the role of Joyce in the 2019 romantic comedy film, "Plan B", produced by Sarah Hassan and directed by the Nigerian film maker, Dolapo Adeleke (Lowladee). For her role as Joyce, she was once again nominated for the Best Supporting Actress in Film category in the 9th edition of the Kenya Film Commission Kalasha Awards 2019.

Catherine Kamau has also recently featured in two movies The Grand Little Lie (GLL) as part of the main cast. The movie premiered on October 1.

She is also a content creator and a YouTuber. On her YouTube channel, she speaks on fashion, style, acting, lifestyle and motherhood. She is passionate on the issue of teenage pregnancies. Having been a teen mother, and has a dubbed phrase 'Queens must wait', in which she encourages young girls to wait first before deciding to be mothers.

Personal life
Kamau has been married to Phillip Karanja (alias Phil or Melvin), a film director and former Tahidi High actor since November 17, 2017. Their honeymoon was celebrated in Seychelles. In an earlier relationship while at Kampala International University in Uganda, at the age of 19, she gave birth to her first son, Leon Karanja, in 2006 who Phillip adopted. In September 2019, it was revealed by several news media that she and her husband were expecting their first child together. The actress was said also to have hosted a baby shower in December of that year to celebrate the pregnancy which was predicted to be a baby girl. They went on a babymoon in The Maldives. She shared how she almost gave up getting pregnant again. She later revealed on the 15th of December 2019, that her husband's first child with her was a baby girl Njeri ("Baby K").

Filmography

Awards and nominations

References

External links
 Catherine Kamau Biography
 Catherine Kamau Awards

Kenyan film actresses
Living people
1987 births
Place of birth missing (living people)
Kenyan television actresses
21st-century Kenyan actresses